James Francis Quigley (December 22, 1859 – November 12, 1935) was an American lawyer and politician from New York. James was born on December 22, 1859, in Greenpoint, Brooklyn, New York. He was the son of Irish immigrants Patrick B. Quigley and Elizabeth T. Culley. Patrick had a stage line that ran from Greenpoint to Fulton Ferry.

He attended Columbia Law School and passed the bar in 1885. He developed a law firm with John R. Farrar called Quigley & Farrar, which represented some of the leading Brooklyn firms.

In 1890, James was elected to the New York State Assembly, representing the Kings County 8th District. He served in the Assembly in 1891, 1892, and 1893. In 1893, he was the Majority Leader of the Assembly and chairman of the Ways and Means Committee.

In July 1894, James was appointed Police Justice to fill the deceased Robert E. Connelly's remaining term. He was removed from office in March 1895 for being too sympathetic with strikers.

In 1904, James was appointed Assistant Corporation Counsel and put in charge of the Bureau of Street Openings. He resigned in 1910.

James returned to practicing law, specializing in condemnation proceedings. He later moved from Bushwick to Merrick, Nassau County.

In 1893, John married Irish immigrant Mary Theresa Davidson in a ceremony officiated by Bishop Charles Edward McDonnell. Mary died in 1905. He later married Linda M. Phileo.

James died on November 12, 1935, in his Merrick home. He was buried in Holy Cross Cemetery.

References

External links 
 Political Graveyard
 Find a Grave

1859 births
1935 deaths
Politicians from Brooklyn
Democratic Party members of the New York State Assembly
American people of Irish descent
Lawyers from Brooklyn
19th-century American judges
19th-century American politicians
20th-century American politicians
Burials at Holy Cross Cemetery, Brooklyn
People from Greenpoint, Brooklyn
People from Bushwick, Brooklyn
People from Merrick, New York